Marissa Lenti (born September 18, 1992) is an American voice actor and ADR director who has worked with Funimation, Sentai Filmworks and Sound Cadence Studios. Some of Lenti's noteworthy roles include Yuna in Kuma Kuma Kuma Bear, Shoko Majima in Kokkoku, Chiaki Hoshinomori in Gamers!, and Alicia Florence in Aria the Animation.

Biography
Lenti started theatre acting at age 8, and began taking on-camera roles around the age of 12. Lenti went on to accumulate over a decade of experience as a seamstress, at one point owning a business making costumes and dolls. While in college studying Costume Design, they decided to pursue voice acting instead. In order to pursue this goal, they used funds saved from the business to move from Boston to Texas.

While in Dallas, Lenti attended Haberkon, a small convention thrown by fellow voice actor Todd Haberkorn, and met Tyler Walker, an ADR director at Funimation. Walker went on to cast Lenti in the English dub of Tokyo ESP and later Lenti's first named character, as Libra in Fairy Tail. Their first main character was Chiaki Hoshinomori in Gamers!.

Lenti joined Sound Cadence Studios in May 2016 as an ADR director, writer, and production assistant. While at Sound Cadence, they have gone on to direct many shows, including Kemono Friends, Kageki Shoujo!! and Arte.

In a 2019 interview, fellow ADR Director David Wald shared that Lenti is asexual.

Filmography

Anime series

Films

Video games

References

External links
 
 
 
 

1992 births
American voice actors
American voice directors
American video game actors
Asexual people
LGBT actresses
Living people
21st-century American actors
21st-century LGBT people